The Venture Capital Journal, or VCJ, is a monthly glossy magazine that covers investment trends, financing techniques and news from across the Venture Capital industry. The magazine, founded in 1961, focuses on venture capital and features expert analysis and commentary. Top venture capitalists who have been featured in VCJ include Jim Breyer, Steve Westly, John Doerr, William Henry Draper III, Timothy C. Draper, Pitch Johnson, Vinod Khosla, Ray Lane, Michael Moritz, Tom Perkins Lip-Bu Tan, Arthur Rock, Heidi Roizen, Paul Wythes, and Don Valentine.

VCJ, based in San Francisco, is published by Jim Beecher and edited by Alastair Goldfisher. The editorial staff is composed of Lawrence Aragon and Mark Boslet.

VCJ was acquired by UCG from Thomson Reuters in 2014. UCG sold VCJ to Simplify Compliance, a portfolio company of Leeds Equity Partners, in 2016.

References

External links
Venture Capital Journal website
peHUB website

1961 establishments in California
Monthly magazines published in the United States
Business magazines published in the United States
Magazines established in 1961
Magazines published in San Francisco
Professional and trade magazines